Grèzes is the name of several communes in France:

 Grèzes, Dordogne
 Grèzes, Haute-Loire
 Grèzes, Lot
 Grèzes, Lozère